Horbury Junction railway station served the village of Horbury, West Yorkshire, England from 1850 to 1927 on the Hallam Line.

History 
The station opened on 1 January 1850 by the Lancashire and Yorkshire Railway. The station was situated at the bottom of Green Lane, where the M1 motorway now crosses the valley on a bridge. The station was replaced by  station and closed completely on 11 July 1927.

References

External links 

Disused railway stations in Wakefield
Former Lancashire and Yorkshire Railway stations
Railway stations in Great Britain opened in 1850
Railway stations in Great Britain closed in 1927
1850 establishments in England
1927 disestablishments in England